Electric Eel Shock (EES) are a three-piece garage rock band, formed in Tokyo in 1994. They first toured the United States in 1999.

History

Background

Akihito Morimoto, known as 'Aki' (guitar and vocals) and Kazuto Maekawa (bass) first met in high school in Osaka. Aki learned English from the lyrics of bands he liked. Before Electric Eel Shock, Morimoto and Maekawa first formed an 80s metal cover band in high school called Caducious.

Morimoto and Maekawa moved to Tokyo and played as guitarist and bassist in a five-piece pop rock band. Morimoto later said that one of the main reasons for this band's demise was that they acted on everything that they were told, and as a result soon became directionless. This helped form the attitude of Electric Eel Shock – that musicians should listen to the views of others, but should learn from their own mistakes.

After the demise of the pop rock band, Morimoto and Maekawa stayed in Tokyo. Morimoto followed his passion of fishing and became a competitive angler (he still writes for Japan's largest fishing magazine, Basser Magazine) and Maekawa joined The Apollos (a well-known Japanese funk band) as session bassist. Maekawa's low-slung bass and unkempt appearance was at odds with The Apollos' suited and polished image, and meant that his time in this role was short-lived. However, Maekawa left a lasting impression on their drummer, Tomoharu Ito (known as Gian, due to his similar appearance to a well-known Japanese comedian of that name). Gian, who had a day job making artificial teeth, was soon introduced to Morimoto, and the three started practicing together shortly afterwards.

Early years
The first incarnation of Electric Eel Shock was different from their current attributes. The band's first public performances were as an 11-piece group with keyboards, female vocals and French horns. It was not until the logistics of getting all of its members together on the same day to practice became unworkable that the band stripped down to a three-piece.

Gian took up playing with four drumsticks, and also gained a reputation for playing almost naked. Gian has been arrested once, in Hong Kong and fined HK$100, for playing this way.

Electric Eel Shock decided against making demos and sending them to record companies. Instead, they quickly set up the Micro Music record label with their friends, and released their first full-length album, Maybe... I Think We Can Beat Nirvana. They followed this with Live Punctured.

In 1999, Electric Eel Shock recorded Slayers Bay Blues on an eight-track recorder, and made enough copies to begin their first concerts abroad. They had lined up a handful of dates in and around New York, including CBGB, with their friends Peelander-Z who had relocated there some time earlier. Due to the success of these few gigs, the handful of dates that were planned turned into an East Coast tour.

Go America
Shortly after returning to Japan, EES sold their property and left their homes. They returned to the US and toured almost constantly for the next two years. All the while, the band survived on the sale of CDs, t-shirts, and help from friends. They then recorded the EP Go America.

Go Europe
In early 2003 the band received an email invitation from journalist Bob Slayer to perform in London. On January 16, 2003, Electric Eel Shock landed in London for five hastily-arranged gigs. The five shows rapidly become twelve gigs in ten days. The band used the London Underground as their only form of transport. After this, they returned to the US with Bob Slayer as their new manager.

The band spent the rest of 2003 between the US and Europe. Highlights included playing at both the SXSW and CMJ festivals in America, playing at Roskilde Festival in Denmark, headlining the Rockit Hong Kong Music Festival, and supporting the Canadian band Danko Jones on a 40-date European tour.

At the start of 2004 Electric Eel Shock went into the studio for the last of the Go sessions. Although these were still produced on  a relatively low budget, and paid for by the band, this was the first time that they had used a studio and sound engineer as opposed to a practice room, kitchen or cupboard. The results, Go Europe! / Go USA!, were licensed around the world and the band went on a promotional tour that took in 25 countries and 27 European festivals.

Beat Me
The band's European base camp for much of their touring in 2004 was the Suicide Motel in Utrecht, Netherlands, which Bob Slayer set up with Frank Suicide the guitarist of the Dutch band Wasted. Whilst spending time in the Netherlands they developed their friendship with Grammy-nominated producer Attie Bauw (who had worked with Judas Priest and the Scorpions) that they had met in Amsterdam during the Danko Jones tour. Electric Eel Shock were soon making plans with Attie Bauw for a new album. This would represent a move away from their garage rock roots. The aim was to catch all the energy and character of an Electric Eel Shock performance with a production that would sit alongside the early Black Sabbath albums that had inspired their creation. Assisting Attie in the studio was the band's live engineer, Tim Bray, who had become a fixture on tour with the band.

The band finished recording Beat Me at the end of December 2004, and returned to Japan for the first time in a long time, to do a few gigs.

Throughout 2005 EES shows have become larger; touring in the US and Europe with the Bloodhound Gang, headlining festivals, and playing with the West Yorkshire Symphony Orchestra. Electric Eel Shock also made an appearance in the video clip for the Bloodhound Gang song "Uhn Tiss Uhn Tiss Uhn Tiss". Their tours throughout Europe at the end of 2005 were completely sold out.

In March 2006, Beat Me was released in Japan on legendary metal label Roadrunner Records. The band toured Japan, Australia, New Zealand and the US in 2006 and played festivals in Europe.

Transworld Ultra Rock
Electric Eel Shock released Transworld Ultra Rock on October 1, 2007. The album was the first release on their own label Double Peace Records. The band toured throughout Europe in support of the new album, later appearing as a support act on The Presidents of the United States of America's These Are the Good Times People tour. The album was released by P-Vine records on November 16, 2007 in Japan.

Sugoi Indeed
Electric Eel Shock joined Sellaband on 2 May 2008 to raise the funds to record their next album. On 25 June 2008 after 55 days the band successfully raised $50,000.

The press release describes Sugoi Indeed as an album full of classic rock hand-crafted in Japan. Attie Bauw, (Judas Priest, Scorpions) who produced the last two EES albums, was at the controls again, only this time he engineered the basic tracks and Electric Eel Shock took the production reins on the album themselves.

The album was licensed to several labels around the world and was released in October 2009.

Crowdfunding
Electric Eel Shock has always had strong support from their fans and became one of the first bands without previous significant record label success to fully embrace crowdfunding. In 2004 they raised £10,000 from 100 fans (the Samurai 100) by offering them guestlist for life.  Two years later they became the fastest band to raise the 50,000 budget through SellaBand.  The album Sugoi Indeed, has been licensed to Universal Records in Japan and various independent labels around the world.

EES and their UK based manager Bob Slayer became consultants on first SellaBand and later PledgeMusic. Having played an important role in establishing the viability and model for Crowd Funding in music they have now launched their own crowd funding site Fan-Bo.com. Launched in June 2012 Fan-Bo is a place where fans of Japanese pop culture can support independent bands, artists, writers and other creatives.

Discography

Albums
Maybe... I Think We Can Beat Nirvana (1997) 
 Live Punctured (1998)
 Slayers Bay Blues (1999)
 Go Europe! (2004)
 Go USA! (2005)
 Beat Me (2005)
 Transworld Ultra Rock (2007)
 Sugoi Indeed (2009)
 Sweet Generation (2017)

Singles/EPs
 Go America (EP) (2002)
 Do The Metal 7" (2003)
 Rock & Roll Can Rescue the World Split 7" w/The Riverboat Gamblers (2005)
 Big Mistake 7" (2007)
 Attack America II CD Single (2012)

Videos/DVDs
 Slayer's Bay Blues (2000) VHS
 Go Roskilde (2003) Live Concert DVD

Compilations
 Welcome To Gearhead Country (Gearhead) (2006)
 Thunder Tracks (DefSTAR) (2008)

Documentaries
Sex, Drugs, & Email

Live drummers
From 2007 to 2011 Gian was unable to make all tours, when he was not available to tour EES used a number of stand in drummers: Gian is now back in the band permanently.
 Damon Richardson (ex Danko Jones) - Europe 2007
 Roland Ritchie (ex Wasted) - the Netherlands and HMV 
 Kosho - Wacken 2007 
 Hiroto "The Ginger Drummer" - Presidents of USA tour
 James "Bronski Beat" Thomas (ex Sludgefeast and A&E Line)

References

External links

Electric Eel Shock on Sellaband

Japanese garage rock groups
Japanese hard rock musical groups
Japanese heavy metal musical groups
Musical groups from Tokyo
Japanese musical trios
Gearhead Records artists